The Sphaerophoraceae are a family of lichenized fungi in the order Lecanorales. Species of this family have a widespread distribution, especially in southern temperate regions. Sphaerophoraceae was circumscribed by mycologist Elias Magnus Fries in 1831.

Genera
Sphaerophoraceae contains 6 genera and 39 species. Following the genus name is the taxonomic authority, year of publication, and the number of species:
Austropeltum  – 1 sp.
Bunodophoron  – 25 spp.
Calycidium  – 2 spp.
Leifidium  – 1 sp.
Neophyllis  – 2 spp.
Sphaerophorus  – 8 spp.

References

Lecanorales
Lichen families
Lecanoromycetes families
Taxa described in 1831
Taxa named by Elias Magnus Fries